Ferenc Csik (12 December 1913 – 29 March 1945) was a Hungarian swimmer who competed in the 1936 Summer Olympics.

In the 1936, Olympics he won a gold medal in the 100 m freestyle event and a bronze medal in the 4×200 m freestyle relay event. Csik went on to become a medical doctor, and died during World War II in an air raid while assisting a wounded man.

See also
 List of members of the International Swimming Hall of Fame
 World record progression 4 × 100 metres freestyle relay

References

External links
profile
Katalin Csik: Body, Soul and Mind in Harmony - book

1913 births
1945 deaths
People from Kaposvár
Hungarian male swimmers
Olympic swimmers of Hungary
Swimmers at the 1936 Summer Olympics
Olympic gold medalists for Hungary
Olympic bronze medalists for Hungary
World record setters in swimming
Olympic bronze medalists in swimming
Hungarian male freestyle swimmers
European Aquatics Championships medalists in swimming
Hungarian military personnel of World War II
Deaths by airstrike during World War II
European champions for Hungary
Medalists at the 1936 Summer Olympics
Olympic gold medalists in swimming
Hungarian military personnel killed in World War II
20th-century Hungarian physicians
Sportspeople from Somogy County